This is a list of the longest-running television series in Spain.

See also
 List of longest-running UK television series
List of longest-running United States television series
List of longest-running Philippine television series
List of longest-running Indian television series

References 

Spanish television series
Spanish television-related lists